Rachel Marie Buehler Van Hollebeke (born August 26, 1985) is an American former soccer player who last played as a defender for the Portland Thorns FC and the United States women's national soccer team. In 2015, Van Hollebeke retired from playing professional soccer, and soon after began attending medical school at UC San Diego School of Medicine.

Early life

Stanford University
Van Hollebeke attended Stanford University, where she was named by the NCAA Honors Committee as a recipient of the NCAA Top VIII Award, and completed her senior year in 2007, majoring in human biology/pre-medicine.  A three-year captain for the Cardinal, Van Hollebeke was an All-Pac-10 Conference First-Team selection, an NSCAA First-Team All-American Scholar Athlete, and was chosen as the ESPN Academic All-American of the Year. As a redshirt junior in 2006, she was one of two players in the conference to be selected in the All-Pac-10 First Team and the Pac-10 All-Academic First Team.

Playing career

Club

FC Gold Pride, 2009 
On September 16, 2008, Van Hollebeke was one of three members of the 2008 Beijing gold medal team allocated to the brand new Santa Clara, California, club FC Gold Pride, along with Nicole Barnhart and Leslie Osborne. FC Gold Pride, coached by former San Jose Clash midfielder Albertin Montoya, was the seventh and final club named in 2008 to compete in the inaugural season of Women's Professional Soccer (WPS) the following year.

Portland Thorns FC, 2013–2015
On January 11, 2013, Van Hollebeke was one of three members from the United States women's national team that was allocated to the new NWSL club Portland Thorns FC, along with Alex Morgan and Tobin Heath.

On August 23, 2015, Defender Rachel Van Hollebeke announced her retirement from
international and professional soccer at the conclusion of the 2015
National Women's Soccer League (NWSL) season. Van Hollebeke retires
after playing six professional seasons, including the last three with
Portland Thorns FC in the NWSL.  In three seasons with Thorns FC, Van Hollebeke appeared in 44
regular-season matches (38 starts), logging 3,429 minutes. Van Hollebeke
helped guide Portland to the 2013 NWSL Championship, featuring in both
postseason matches during the team's inaugural campaign. The 2013 Thorns
FC Defender of the Year, Van Hollebeke earned NWSL Second XI honors,
playing the full 90 minutes in 20 of the team's 22 regular-season games
in 2013. Additionally, Van Hollebeke played an active role in community
events through the club's Stand Together community platform and was
named 2014 Community Player of the Year for all of her efforts.

International
Van Hollebeke has played on several U.S. national youth teams, including U-16 and U-17, and was a member of the first place 2002 FIFA U-19 Women's World Championship in Canada and the third place team at the 2004 FIFA U-19 Women's World Championship in Thailand. She joined the national team training camp in July 2006 and debuted for the full team in March 2008 at the Algarve Cup in Portugal. Van Hollebeke was named to the 2008 U.S. Olympic women's soccer team on June 23, 2008. She appeared in two matches, chipping in with one assist. She was also chosen for the 2011 FIFA Women's World Cup squad and scored on the USA's opening game against  North Korea. Van Hollebeke was part of the team that won the gold medal at the 2012 London Olympics. Van Hollebeke appeared in all six matches and played all but 35 minutes of the United States gold medal campaign.

On March 6, 2013, in the opening game of the Algarve Cup, Van Hollebeke became only the 29th female to play 100 times for the United States. Van Hollebeke's very first appearance with the national team was in 2008 at the very same tournament. During her 100th cap against Iceland, Van Hollebeke scored a goal, making her only the 4th U.S. woman next to Tiffeny Milbrett, Shannon MacMillan, and Abby Wambach to score in their 100th appearance.

Career statistics

Club

International

(*Correct )

International goals
Rachel Van Hollebeke scored 5 goals in international competition; one each in World Cup final tournament, Olympic qualification, World Cup qualification, the Algarve Cup, and a friendly match.

Personal life
Rachel married Bobby Van Hollebeke on November 17, 2012, at Balboa Park in San Diego.  She announced that she would be using her husband's last name professionally from 2014 on.

Van Hollebeke's tough playing style earned her the well-known nickname "The Buehldozer".

Van Hollebeke began medical school at the University of California, San Diego School of Medicine in August 2015 and retired from soccer after the 2015 NWSL season.

See also

 List of footballers with 100 or more caps
 List of Olympic medalists in football
 All-time FC Gold Pride roster

References

Match reports

External links
 
 
 US Soccer player profile
 FC Gold Pride player profile
 

1985 births
Living people
American women's soccer players
American people of German descent
United States women's international soccer players
Stanford Cardinal women's soccer players
Olympic gold medalists for the United States in soccer
Footballers at the 2008 Summer Olympics
Footballers at the 2012 Summer Olympics
FC Gold Pride players
Boston Breakers players
2011 FIFA Women's World Cup players
National Women's Soccer League players
Portland Thorns FC players
FIFA Century Club
Medalists at the 2012 Summer Olympics
Medalists at the 2008 Summer Olympics
Iga FC Kunoichi players
Nadeshiko League players
American expatriate women's soccer players
American expatriate sportspeople in Japan
Expatriate women's footballers in Japan
American expatriate sportspeople in Australia
Expatriate women's soccer players in Australia
People from Del Mar, California
Soccer players from California
Women's association football defenders
Women's Professional Soccer players